Tetracerasta is a genus of trematodes in the family Aephnidiogenidae. It consists of one species, Tetracerasta blepta Watson, 1984.

References

Aephnidiogenidae
Trematode genera
Monotypic protostome genera